Mochudi Stadium is a multi-use stadium in Gaborone, Botswana.  It is used mostly for football matches and serves as the home stadium of Centre Chiefs.  The stadium holds 10,000 people.

External links
Venue information

Football venues in Gaborone